Sir John Hamilton of Cadzow, 4th Laird of Cadzow (born before 1370 – died c. 1402) was a Scottish nobleman and soldier.

He succeeded his father, David Hamilton of Cadzow, no later than 1392, when he appears on a charter of Andrew Murray of Touchadam as Dominus de Cadzow.

He was imprisoned, along with his brothers William and Andrew, in Norwich in 1396. Richard II of England ordered their release from the Mayor and bailies of that city on 29 June. It appears that their imprisonment was due to violations of the truce between the Kingdoms of England and Scotland. A John Hamilton, either his brother John Hamilton of Bardowie, or uncle John Hamilton of Fingalton, was released from the Tower of London on the same date. Hamilton and his uncle seem to have found themselves guests of the English again, when at a meeting of Border commissioners at Hawdenstank on 28 October 1398, the first point of business was the release of Hamilton of Cadzow, and Hamilton of Fingalton and others in their entourage. The Hamiltons had been caught at sea by English privateers, again in violation of the truce. The English were urged to release the ship and restore their goods to them, or alternatively pay suitable recompense.

There is no record of Hamilton's death, though it is possible that he was one of the prisoner fatalities at the Battle of Homildon Hill in 1402, where a Sir John Hamilton, elder, appears on a list of captives.

Marriage and children
John Hamilton married Jacoba Douglas, sister of Sir James Douglas, 1st Lord Dalkeith, prior to 1388. It was thought that he had three sons & a daughter by her:
James Hamilton of Cadzow
David Hamilton of Dalserf
Walter Hamilton of Raploch
Catherine Hamilton of Cadzow

References

Notes

Sources
Anderson, John, Historical and genealogical memoirs of the House of Hamilton; with genealogical memoirs of the several branches of the family Edinburgh 1825 
Balfour Paul, Sir James, The Scots Peerage Vol IV. Edinburgh 1907 
The Peerage.com

14th-century births
1400s deaths
Norman warriors
Scoto-Normans
People from South Lanarkshire
John

Year of birth unknown

Year of death uncertain